Belmont, in north-east Port of Spain, in the Republic of Trinidad and Tobago, is located at the foot of the Laventille Hills; it was the city's first suburb. In the 1840s–'50s, parts of the area were settled by Africans rescued by the Royal Navy from illegal slaving ships. In the 1880s–'90s, the population swelled rapidly, and the characteristic Belmont street pattern of narrow, winding lanes developed. The black professional class built large homes in Belmont, as they were excluded from the more expensive neighbourhoods such as St. Clair and Maraval; Belmont became known as "the Black St. Clair". Many of these large homes have been renovated and converted to business use, but some remain in family hands. Belmont currently is a lower-middle to middle-class residential neighbourhood. It was the birthplace and early home of many important Carnival designers and bandleaders. Belmont has 9,035 inhabitants.

Buildings in Belmont
One of the more recent renovations in Belmont which was done with a view to preserving the historic character of the  building is Myler House. The image in the attached link, is that of Myler House. This house is located on Myler Street and Belmont Circular Road, Belmont. According to Let me tell you about My Island site, "the first President of the Republic of Trinidad and Tobago was born on Myler Street".

Other buildings which are either historic due to the age of the existing building or the principle on which the property was established to be used are as follows:
 St Jude's Home for Girls located on the Belmont Circular Road. This Home was established in 1923 according to the image which is located on the website.
 The St. Dominic's Home which is located on the Belmont Circular Road is in close proximity to the St. Jude's Home. The St. Dominic's Home is located in the St. Dominic's Compound and has been in existence for approximately one hundred and forty five (145) years.
 L'Hospice – This Home for the Aged is located in close proximity to Charlotte and Park Streets. This Home has been in existence for approximately one hundred and fifty nine (159) years.

There are schools and churches of at least two denominations which are located within Belmont. These are  Anglican and Catholic schools and churches. Also there is a tertiary educational institute which falls under the auspices of the Roman Catholic Archdiocese of Port of Spain – CREDI – Catholic Religious Education Development Institute. This Institute is located in the St. Dominic's compound and offers undergraduate and post graduate programmes, along with certificate programmes and short courses.

Belmont is famous for having one of the few churches in the island which is dedicated to St. Francis of Assisi. This church is located on the Belmont Circular Road and is approximately one hundred and fourteen (114) years old.

Cemeteries located in Belmont
Although taxi drivers who ply the Belmont route speak of the number of cemeteries which are located in the area, the website "Burial Grounds, Cemeteries & Cremation sites in Trinidad" lists one cemetery with an address which is located in Belmont, under the heading of Port of Spain. The cemetery which is being referred to is  "St. Margaret of Antioch Anglican Church Cemetery, St. Margaret’s Lane, Belmont". Although the address of the cemetery is listed as St. Margaret's Lane, the church and cemetery are also accessed from the Belmont Circular Road, Belmont as the property is situated on a corner.

Famous persons from Belmont
LeRoy Clarke is one of the well known artists of Trinidad and Tobago. Some of his works are on display at the Unit Trust Corporation Head Office on Independence Square, Port of Spain. His works are done in oil and are abstract in concept.  In 1998, he was the first to be conferred the title Master Artist by The National Museum and Art Gallery of Trinidad and Tobago. His hometown was Gonzalez, Belmont.

Other famous persons from Belmont include:
 Stokely Carmichael a.k.a. Kwame Ture - Civil Rights Era leader in the United States of America
 Ellis Clarke - First President of the Republic of Trinidad and Tobago
 Claudia Jones - Journalist, activist and founder of the Notting Hill Carnival.
 David Rudder - Calypsonian

References

1840s establishments in the British Empire
Geography of Port of Spain